James Mercer Langston Hughes (February 1, 1901 – May 22, 1967) was an American poet, social activist, novelist, playwright, and columnist from Joplin, Missouri. One of the earliest innovators of the literary art form called jazz poetry, Hughes is best known as a leader of the Harlem Renaissance. He famously wrote about the period that "the Negro was in vogue", which was later paraphrased as "when Harlem was in vogue."

Growing up in a series of Midwestern towns, Hughes became a prolific writer at an early age. He moved to New York City as a young man, where he made his career. He graduated from high school in Cleveland, Ohio, and soon began studies at Columbia University in New York City. Although he dropped out, he gained notice from New York publishers, first in The Crisis magazine and then from book publishers, and became known in the creative community in Harlem. He eventually graduated from Lincoln University. In addition to poetry, Hughes wrote plays and short stories. He also published several nonfiction works. From 1942 to 1962, as the civil rights movement was gaining traction, he wrote an in-depth weekly column in a leading black newspaper, The Chicago Defender.

Biography

Ancestry and childhood 

Like many African-Americans, Hughes had a complex ancestry. Both of Hughes' paternal great-grandmothers were enslaved Africans, and both of his paternal great-grandfathers were white slave owners in Kentucky. According to Hughes, one of these men was Sam Clay, a Scottish-American whiskey distiller of Henry County, said to be a relative of statesman Henry Clay. The other putative paternal ancestor whom Hughes named was Silas Cushenberry, a slave trader of Clark County. Hughes wrote that Cushenberry was a Jewish slave trader, but a study of the Cushenberry family genealogy in the nineteenth century has found no Jewish affiliation. Hughes's maternal grandmother Mary Patterson was of African-American, French, English and Native American descent. One of the first women to attend Oberlin College, she married Lewis Sheridan Leary, also of mixed-race descent, before her studies. In 1859, Lewis Leary joined John Brown's raid on Harpers Ferry in West Virginia, where he was fatally wounded.

Ten years later, in 1869, the widow Mary Patterson Leary married again, into the elite, politically active Langston family. (See The Talented Tenth.) Her second husband was Charles Henry Langston, of African-American, Euro-American and Native American ancestry. He and his younger brother John Mercer Langston worked for the abolitionist cause and helped lead the Ohio Anti-Slavery Society in 1858.

After their marriage, Charles Langston moved with his family to Kansas, where he was active as an educator and activist for voting and rights for African Americans. His and Mary's daughter Caroline (known as Carrie) became a schoolteacher and married James Nathaniel Hughes (1871–1934). They had two children; the second was Langston Hughes, by most sources born in 1901 in Joplin, Missouri (though Hughes himself claims in his autobiography to have been born in 1902).
 
Langston Hughes grew up in a series of Midwestern small towns. His father left the family soon after the boy was born and later divorced Carrie. The senior Hughes traveled to Cuba and then Mexico, seeking to escape the enduring racism in the United States.

After the separation, Hughes's mother traveled, seeking employment. Langston was raised mainly in Lawrence, Kansas, by his maternal grandmother, Mary Patterson Langston. Through the black American oral tradition and drawing from the activist experiences of her generation, Mary Langston instilled in her grandson a lasting sense of racial pride. Imbued by his grandmother with a duty to help his race, Hughes identified with neglected and downtrodden black people all his life, and glorified them in his work. He lived most of his childhood in Lawrence.  In his 1940 autobiography The Big Sea, he wrote: "I was unhappy for a long time, and very lonesome, living with my grandmother. Then it was that books began to happen to me, and I began to believe in nothing but books and the wonderful world in books—where if people suffered, they suffered in beautiful language, not in monosyllables, as we did in Kansas."

After the death of his grandmother, Hughes went to live with family friends, James and Auntie Mary Reed, for two years. Later, Hughes lived again with his mother Carrie in Lincoln, Illinois. She had remarried when he was an adolescent. The family moved to the Fairfax neighborhood of Cleveland, Ohio, where he attended Central High School and was taught by Helen Maria Chesnutt, whom he found inspiring.

His writing experiments began when he was young. While in grammar school in Lincoln, Hughes was elected class poet. He stated that in retrospect he thought it was because of the stereotype about African Americans having rhythm.

I was a victim of a stereotype. There were only two of us Negro kids in the whole class and our English teacher was always stressing the importance of rhythm in poetry. Well, everyone knows, except us, that all Negroes have rhythm, so they elected me as class poet.

During high school in Cleveland, Hughes wrote for the school newspaper, edited the yearbook, and began to write his first short stories, poetry, and dramatic plays. His first piece of jazz poetry, "When Sue Wears Red", was written while he was in high school.

Relationship with father 
Hughes had a very poor relationship with his father, whom he seldom saw when a child. He lived briefly with his father in Mexico in 1919. Upon graduating from high school in June 1920, Hughes returned to Mexico to live with his father, hoping to convince him to support his plan to attend Columbia University. Hughes later said that, prior to arriving in Mexico, "I had been thinking about my father and his strange dislike of his own people. I didn't understand it, because I was a Negro, and I liked Negroes very much." His father had hoped Hughes would choose to study at a university abroad and train for a career in engineering. On these grounds, he was willing to provide financial assistance to his son but did not support his desire to be a writer. Eventually, Hughes and his father came to a compromise: Hughes would study engineering, so long as he could attend Columbia. His tuition provided, Hughes left his father after more than a year.

While at Columbia in 1921, Hughes managed to maintain a B+ grade average. He published poetry in the Columbia Daily Spectator under a pen name. He left in 1922 because of racial prejudice among students and teachers. He was denied a room on campus because he was black. Eventually he settled in Hartley Hall, but he still suffered from racism among his classmates, who seemed hostile to anyone who did not fit into a WASP category. He was attracted more to the African-American people and neighborhood of Harlem than to his studies, but he continued writing poetry. Harlem was a center of vibrant cultural life.

Adulthood 
Hughes worked at various odd jobs before serving a brief tenure as a crewman aboard the S.S. Malone in 1923, spending six months traveling to West Africa and Europe. In Europe, Hughes left the S.S. Malone for a temporary stay in Paris. There he met and had a romance with Anne Marie Coussey, a British-educated African from a well-to-do Gold Coast family; they subsequently corresponded, but she eventually married Hugh Wooding, a promising Trinidadian lawyer. Wooding later served as chancellor of the University of the West Indies.

During his time in England in the early 1920s, Hughes became part of the black expatriate community. In November 1924, he returned to the U.S. to live with his mother in Washington, D.C. After assorted odd jobs, he gained white-collar employment in 1925 as a personal assistant to historian Carter G. Woodson at the Association for the Study of African American Life and History. As the work demands limited his time for writing, Hughes quit the position to work as a busboy at the Wardman Park Hotel. Hughes's earlier work had been published in magazines and was about to be collected into his first book of poetry when he encountered poet Vachel Lindsay, with whom he shared some poems. Impressed, Lindsay publicized his discovery of a new black poet. 

The following year, Hughes enrolled in Lincoln University, a historically black university in Chester County, Pennsylvania. He joined the Omega Psi Phi fraternity.

After Hughes earned a B.A. degree from Lincoln University in 1929, he returned to New York. Except for travels to the Soviet Union and parts of the Caribbean, he lived in Harlem as his primary home for the remainder of his life. During the 1930s, he became a resident of Westfield, New Jersey for a time, sponsored by his patron Charlotte Osgood Mason.

Sexuality

Some academics and biographers believe that Hughes was homosexual and included homosexual codes in many of his poems, as did Walt Whitman, who, Hughes said, influenced his poetry. Hughes's story "Blessed Assurance" deals with a father's anger over his son's effeminacy and "queerness". The biographer Aldrich argues that, in order to retain the respect and support of black churches and organizations and avoid exacerbating his precarious financial situation, Hughes remained closeted.

Arnold Rampersad, the primary biographer of Hughes, determined that Hughes exhibited a preference for African-American men in his work and life. But, in his biography Rampersad denies Hughes's homosexuality, and concludes that Hughes was probably asexual and passive in his sexual relationships. Hughes did, however, show a respect and love for his fellow black man (and woman). Other scholars argue for his homosexuality: his love of black men is evidenced in a number of reported unpublished poems to an alleged black male lover.

Death 
On May 22, 1967, Hughes died in the Stuyvesant Polyclinic in New York City at the age of 66 from complications after abdominal surgery related to prostate cancer. His ashes are interred beneath a floor medallion in the middle of the foyer in the Schomburg Center for Research in Black Culture in Harlem. It is the entrance to an auditorium named for him. The design on the floor is an African cosmogram entitled Rivers. The title is taken from his poem "The Negro Speaks of Rivers". Within the center of the cosmogram is the line: "My soul has grown deep like the rivers".

Career 

First published in 1921 in The Crisis—official magazine of the National Association for the Advancement of Colored People (NAACP)—"The Negro Speaks of Rivers" became Hughes's signature poem and was collected in his first book of poetry, The Weary Blues (1926). Hughes's first and last published poems appeared in The Crisis; more of his poems were published in The Crisis than in any other journal. Hughes' life and work were enormously influential during the Harlem Renaissance of the 1920s, alongside those of his contemporaries, Zora Neale Hurston, Wallace Thurman, Claude McKay, Countee Cullen, Richard Bruce Nugent, and Aaron Douglas. Except for McKay, they worked together also to create the short-lived magazine Fire!! Devoted to Younger Negro Artists.

Hughes and his contemporaries had different goals and aspirations than the black middle class. Hughes and his fellows tried to depict the "low-life" in their art, that is, the real lives of blacks in the lower social-economic strata. They criticized the divisions and prejudices within the black community based on skin color. Hughes wrote what would be considered their manifesto, "The Negro Artist and the Racial Mountain", published in The Nation in 1926:

The younger Negro artists who create now intend to express our individual dark-skinned selves without fear or shame. If white people are pleased we are glad. If they are not, it doesn't matter. We know we are beautiful. And ugly, too. The tom-tom cries, and the tom-tom laughs. If colored people are pleased we are glad. If they are not, their displeasure doesn't matter either. We build our temples for tomorrow, strong as we know how, and we stand on top of the mountain free within ourselves.

His poetry and fiction portrayed the lives of the working-class blacks in America, lives he portrayed as full of struggle, joy, laughter, and music. Permeating his work is pride in the African-American identity and its diverse culture. "My seeking has been to explain and illuminate the Negro condition in America and obliquely that of all human kind", Hughes is quoted as saying. He confronted racial stereotypes, protested social conditions, and expanded African America's image of itself; a "people's poet" who sought to reeducate both audience and artist by lifting the theory of the black aesthetic into reality.

Hughes stressed a racial consciousness and cultural nationalism devoid of self-hate. His thought united people of African descent and Africa across the globe to encourage pride in their diverse black folk culture and black aesthetic. Hughes was one of the few prominent black writers to champion racial consciousness as a source of inspiration for black artists. His African-American race consciousness and cultural nationalism would influence many foreign black writers, including Jacques Roumain, Nicolás Guillén, Léopold Sédar Senghor, and Aimé Césaire. Along with the works of Senghor, Césaire, and other French-speaking writers of Africa and of African descent from the Caribbean, such as René Maran from Martinique and Léon Damas from French Guiana in South America, the works of Hughes helped to inspire the Négritude movement in France. A radical black self-examination was emphasized in the face of European colonialism. In addition to his example in social attitudes, Hughes had an important technical influence by his emphasis on folk and jazz rhythms as the basis of his poetry of racial pride.

In 1930, his first novel, Not Without Laughter, won the Harmon Gold Medal for literature. At a time before widespread arts grants, Hughes gained the support of private patrons and he was supported for two years prior to publishing this novel. The protagonist of the story is a boy named Sandy, whose family must deal with a variety of struggles due to their race and class, in addition to relating to one another.

In 1931, Hughes helped form the "New York Suitcase Theater" with playwright Paul Peters, artist Jacob Burck, and writer (soon-to-be underground spy) Whittaker Chambers, an acquaintance from Columbia. In 1932, he was part of a board to produce a Soviet film on "Negro Life" with Malcolm Cowley, Floyd Dell, and Chambers.

In 1931 Prentiss Taylor and Langston Hughes created the Golden Stair Press, issuing broadsides and books featuring the artwork of Prentiss Taylor and the texts of Langston Hughes.  In 1932 they issued The Scottsboro Limited based on the trial of the Scottsboro Boys.

In 1932, Hughes and Ellen Winter wrote a pageant to Caroline Decker in an attempt to celebrate her work with the striking coal miners of the Harlan County War, but it was never performed. It was judged to be a "long, artificial propaganda vehicle too complicated and too cumbersome to be performed."

Maxim Lieber became his literary agent, 1933–45 and 1949–50. (Chambers and Lieber worked in the underground together around 1934–35.)

Hughes' first collection of short stories was published in 1934 with The Ways of White Folks.  He finished the book at a Carmel, California cottage provided for a year by Noel Sullivan, another patron. These stories are a series of vignettes revealing the humorous and tragic interactions between whites and blacks. Overall, they are marked by a general pessimism about race relations, as well as a sardonic realism.  He also became an advisory board member to the (then) newly formed San Francisco Workers' School (later the California Labor School).

In 1935, Hughes received a Guggenheim Fellowship. The same year that Hughes established his theatre troupe in Los Angeles, he realized an ambition related to films by co-writing the screenplay for Way Down South. Hughes believed his failure to gain more work in the lucrative movie trade was due to racial discrimination within the industry.

In 1937 Hughes wrote the long poem, Madrid, his reaction to an assignment to write about black Americans volunteering in the Spanish civil war. His poem, accompanied by 9 etchings evoking the pathos of the Spanish Civil War by Canadian artist Dalla Husband, was published in 1939 as a hardcover book Madrid 1937, printed by Gonzalo Moré, Paris, intended to be an edition of 50. One example of the book, Madrid 37, signed in pencil and annotated as II [Roman numeral two] has appeared on the rare book market.  

In Chicago, Hughes founded The Skyloft Players in 1941, which sought to nurture black playwrights and offer theatre "from the black perspective." Soon thereafter, he was hired to write a column for the Chicago Defender, in which he presented some of his "most powerful and relevant work", giving voice to black people. The column ran for twenty years. Hughes also mentored writer Richard Durham who would later produce a sequence about Hughes in the radio series Destination Freedom. In 1943, Hughes began publishing stories about a character he called Jesse B. Semple, often referred to and spelled "Simple", the everyday black man in Harlem who offered musings on topical issues of the day.  Although Hughes seldom responded to requests to teach at colleges, in 1947 he taught at Atlanta University. In 1949, he spent three months at the University of Chicago Laboratory Schools as a visiting lecturer. Between 1942 and 1949, Hughes was a frequent writer and served on the editorial board of Common Ground, a literary magazine focused on cultural pluralism in the United States published by the Common Council for American Unity (CCAU).

He wrote novels, short stories, plays, poetry, operas, essays, and works for children.  With the encouragement of his best friend and writer, Arna Bontemps, and patron and friend, Carl Van Vechten, he wrote two volumes of autobiography, The Big Sea and I Wonder as I Wander, as well as translating several works of literature into English. With Bontemps, Hughes co-edited the 1949 anthology The Poetry of the Negro, described by The New York Times as "a stimulating cross-section of the imaginative writing of the Negro" that demonstrates "talent to the point where one questions the necessity (other than for its social evidence) of the specialization of 'Negro' in the title".

From the mid-1950s to the mid-1960s, Hughes' popularity among the younger generation of black writers varied even as his reputation increased worldwide. With the gradual advance toward racial integration, many black writers considered his writings of black pride and its corresponding subject matter out of date. They considered him a racial chauvinist. He found some new writers, among them James Baldwin, lacking in such pride, over-intellectual in their work, and occasionally vulgar.

Hughes wanted young black writers to be objective about their race, but not to scorn it or flee it. He understood the main points of the Black Power movement of the 1960s, but believed that some of the younger black writers who supported it were too angry in their work. Hughes's work Panther and the Lash, posthumously published in 1967, was intended to show solidarity with these writers, but with more skill and devoid of the most virulent anger and racial chauvinism some showed toward whites. Hughes continued to have admirers among the larger younger generation of black writers. He often helped writers by offering advice and introducing them to other influential persons in the literature and publishing communities. This latter group, including Alice Walker, whom Hughes discovered, looked upon Hughes as a hero and an example to be emulated within their own work. One of these young black writers (Loften Mitchell) observed of Hughes:

Langston set a tone, a standard of brotherhood and friendship and cooperation, for all of us to follow. You never got from him, 'I am the Negro writer,' but only 'I am a Negro writer.' He never stopped thinking about the rest of us.

Political views 
Hughes was drawn to Communism as an alternative to a segregated America. Many of his lesser-known political writings have been collected in two volumes published by the University of Missouri Press and reflect his attraction to Communism. An example is the poem "A New Song".

In 1932, Hughes became part of a group of black people who went to the Soviet Union to make a film depicting the plight of African Americans in the United States. The film was never made, but Hughes was given the opportunity to travel extensively through the Soviet Union and to the Soviet-controlled regions in Central Asia, the latter parts usually closed to Westerners. While there, he met Robert Robinson, an African American living in Moscow and unable to leave. In Turkmenistan, Hughes met and befriended the Hungarian author Arthur Koestler, then a Communist who was given permission to travel there.

As later noted in Koestler's autobiography, Hughes, together with some forty other Black Americans, had originally been invited to the Soviet Union to produce a Soviet film on "Negro Life", but the Soviets dropped the film idea because of their 1933 success in getting the US to recognize the Soviet Union and establish an embassy in Moscow. This entailed a toning down of Soviet propaganda on racial segregation in America. Hughes and his fellow Blacks were not informed of the reasons for the cancelling, but he and Koestler worked it out for themselves.

Hughes also managed to travel to China, Japan, and Korea before returning to the States.

Hughes's poetry was frequently published in the CPUSA newspaper and he was involved in initiatives supported by Communist organizations, such as the drive to free the Scottsboro Boys. Partly as a show of support for the Republican faction during the Spanish Civil War, in 1937 Hughes traveled to Spain as a correspondent for the Baltimore Afro-American and other various African-American newspapers. In August 1937, he broadcast live from Madrid alongside Harry Haywood and Walter Benjamin Garland. When Hughes was in Spain a Spanish Republican cultural magazine, El Mono Azul, featured Spanish translations of his poems. In November 1937 Hughes departed Spain for which El Mono Azul published a brief farewell message entitled “el gran poeta de raza negra” (“the great poet of the black race”).

Hughes was also involved in other Communist-led organizations such as the John Reed Clubs and the League of Struggle for Negro Rights. He was more of a sympathizer than an active participant. He signed a 1938 statement supporting Joseph Stalin's purges and joined the American Peace Mobilization in 1940 working to keep the U.S. from participating in World War II.

Hughes initially did not favor black American involvement in the war because of the persistence of discriminatory U.S. Jim Crow laws and racial segregation and disfranchisement throughout the South. He came to support the war effort and black American participation after deciding that war service would aid their struggle for civil rights at home. The scholar Anthony Pinn has noted that Hughes, together with Lorraine Hansberry and Richard Wright, was a humanist "critical of belief in God. They provided a foundation for nontheistic participation in social struggle." Pinn has found that such writers are sometimes ignored in the narrative of American history that chiefly credits the civil rights movement to the work of affiliated Christian people.

Hughes was accused of being a Communist by many on the political right, but he always denied it. When asked why he never joined the Communist Party, he wrote, "it was based on strict discipline and the acceptance of directives that I, as a writer, did not wish to accept." In 1953, he was called before the Senate Permanent Subcommittee on Investigations led by Senator Joseph McCarthy. He stated, "I never read the theoretical books of socialism or communism or the Democratic or Republican parties for that matter, and so my interest in whatever may be considered political has been non-theoretical, non-sectarian, and largely emotional and born out of my own need to find some way of thinking about this whole problem of myself." Following his testimony, Hughes distanced himself from Communism. He was rebuked by some on the Radical Left who had previously supported him. He moved away from overtly political poems and towards more lyric subjects. When selecting his poetry for his Selected Poems (1959) he excluded all his radical socialist verse from the 1930s.  These critics on the Left were unaware of the secret interrogation that took place days before the televised hearing.

Representation in other media 

Hughes was featured reciting his poetry on the album Weary Blues (MGM, 1959), with music by Charles Mingus and Leonard Feather, and he also contributed lyrics to Randy Weston's Uhuru Afrika (Roulette, 1960).

Composer Mira Pratesi Sulpizi set Hughes’ text to music in her 1968 song “Lyrics.”

Hughes' life has been portrayed in film and stage productions since the late 20th century. In Looking for Langston (1989), British filmmaker Isaac Julien claimed him as a black gay icon—Julien thought that Hughes' sexuality had historically been ignored or downplayed. Film portrayals of Hughes include Gary LeRoi Gray's role as a teenage Hughes in the short subject film Salvation (2003) (based on a portion of his autobiography The Big Sea), and Daniel Sunjata as Hughes in the Brother to Brother (2004). Hughes' Dream Harlem, a documentary by Jamal Joseph, examines Hughes' works and environment.

Paper Armor (1999) by Eisa Davis and Hannibal of the Alps (2005) by Michael Dinwiddie are plays by African-American playwrights that address Hughes's sexuality. Spike Lee's 1996 film Get on the Bus, included a black gay character, played by Isaiah Washington, who invokes the name of Hughes and punches a homophobic character, saying: "This is for James Baldwin and Langston Hughes."

Hughes was also featured prominently in a national campaign sponsored by the Center for Inquiry (CFI) known as African Americans for Humanism.

Hughes' Ask Your Mama: 12 Moods for Jazz, written in 1960, was performed for the first time in March 2009 with specially composed music by Laura Karpman at Carnegie Hall, at the Honor festival curated by Jessye Norman in celebration of the African-American cultural legacy. Ask Your Mama is the centerpiece of "The Langston Hughes Project", a multimedia concert performance directed by Ron McCurdy, professor of music in the Thornton School of Music at the University of Southern California. The European premiere of The Langston Hughes Project, featuring Ice-T and McCurdy, took place at the Barbican Centre, London, on November 21, 2015, as part of the London Jazz Festival mounted by music producers Serious.

The novel Harlem Mosaics (2012) by Whit Frazier depicts the friendship between Langston Hughes and Zora Neale Hurston, and tells the story of how their friendship fell apart during their collaboration on the play Mule Bone.

On September 22, 2016, his poem "I, Too" was printed on a full page of The New York Times in response to the riots of the previous day in Charlotte, North Carolina.

Literary archives 
The Beinecke Rare Book and Manuscript Library at Yale University holds the Langston Hughes papers (1862–1980) and the Langston Hughes collection (1924–1969) containing letters, manuscripts, personal items, photographs, clippings, artworks, and objects that document the life of Hughes. The Langston Hughes Memorial Library on the campus of Lincoln University, as well as at the James Weldon Johnson Collection within the Yale University also hold archives of Hughes' work. The Moorland-Spingarn Research Center at Howard University includes materials acquired from his travels and contacts through the work of Dorothy B. Porter.

Honors and awards

Living
 1926: Hughes won the Witter Bynner Undergraduate Poetry Prize.
 1935: Hughes was awarded a Guggenheim Fellowship, which allowed him to travel to Spain and Russia.
 1941: Hughes was awarded a fellowship from the Rosenwald Fund.
 1943: Lincoln University awarded Hughes an honorary Litt.D.
 1954: Hughes won the Anisfield-Wolf Book Award.
 1960: the NAACP awarded Hughes the Spingarn Medal for distinguished achievements by an African American.
 1961: National Institute of Arts and Letters.
 1963: Howard University awarded Hughes an honorary doctorate.
 1964: Western Reserve University awarded Hughes an honorary Litt.D.

Memorial
 1973: the first Langston Hughes Medal was awarded by the City College of New York.
 1979: Langston Hughes Middle School was created in Reston, Virginia.
 1981: New York City Landmark status was given to the Harlem home of Langston Hughes at 20 East 127th Street by the New York City Landmarks Preservation Commission and 127th Street was renamed "Langston Hughes Place". The Langston Hughes House was listed on the National Register of Historic Places in 1982.
 2002: The United States Postal Service added the image of Langston Hughes to its Black Heritage series of postage stamps.
 2002: scholar Molefi Kete Asante listed Langston Hughes on his list of 100 Greatest African Americans.
 2009: Langston Hughes High School was created in Fairburn, Georgia.
 2012: inducted into the Chicago Literary Hall of Fame.
 2015: Google Doodle commemorated his 113th birthday.

Bibliography

Poetry collections 
 The Weary Blues, Knopf, 1926
 Fine Clothes to the Jew, Knopf, 1927
 The Negro Mother and Other Dramatic Recitations, 1931
 Dear Lovely Death, 1931
 The Dream Keeper and Other Poems, Knopf, 1932
 Scottsboro Limited: Four Poems and a Play, Golden Stair Press, N.Y., 1932
 A New Song (1938, incl. the poem "Let America be America Again")
 Madrid 1937 with etchings by Dalla Husband, Gonzalo More, Paris, 1939
 Note on Commercial Theatre, 1940
 Shakespeare in Harlem, Knopf, 1942
 Freedom's Plow, New York: Musette Publishers, 1943
 Jim Crow's Last Stand, Atlanta: Negro Publication Society of America, 1943
 Lament for Dark Peoples and Other Poems, 1944
 Fields of Wonder, Knopf, 1947
 One-Way Ticket, 1949
 Montage of a Dream Deferred, Holt, 1951
 Selected Poems of Langston Hughes, 1958
 Ask Your Mama: 12 Moods for Jazz, Hill & Wang, 1961
 The Panther and the Lash: Poems of Our Times, 1967
 The Collected Poems of Langston Hughes, Knopf, 1994

Novels and short story collections 
 Not Without Laughter. Knopf, 1930
 The Ways of White Folks, Knopf, 1934
 Simple Speaks His Mind, 1950
 Laughing to Keep from Crying, Holt, 1952
 Simple Takes a Wife, 1953
 The Sweet Flypaper of Life, photographs by Roy DeCarava. 1955
 Simple Stakes a Claim, 1957
 Tambourines to Glory, 1958
 The Best of Simple, 1961
 Simple's Uncle Sam, 1965
 Something in Common and Other Stories, Hill & Wang, 1963
 Short Stories of Langston Hughes, Hill & Wang, 1996

Non-fiction books 
 The Big Sea, New York: Knopf, 1940
 Famous American Negroes, 1954
 Famous Negro Music Makers, New York: Dodd, Mead, 1955
 I Wonder as I Wander, New York: Rinehart & Co., 1956
 A Pictorial History of the Negro in America, with Milton Meltzer. 1956
 Famous Negro Heroes of America, 1958
 Fight for Freedom: The Story of the NAACP. 1962
 Black Magic: A Pictorial History of the Negro in American Entertainment, with Milton Meltzer, 1967

Major plays 
 Mule Bone, with Zora Neale Hurston, 1931
 Mulatto, 1935 (renamed The Barrier, an opera, in 1950)
 Troubled Island, with William Grant Still, 1936
 Little Ham, 1936
 Emperor of Haiti, 1936
 Don't You Want to be Free?, 1938
 Street Scene, contributed lyrics, 1947
 Tambourines to Glory, 1956
 Simply Heavenly, 1957
 Black Nativity, 1961
 Five Plays by Langston Hughes, Bloomington: Indiana University Press, 1963
 Jerico-Jim Crow, 1964

Books for children 
 Popo and Fifina, with Arna Bontemps, 1932
 The First Book of the Negroes, 1952
 The First Book of Jazz, 1954
 Marian Anderson: Famous Concert Singer, with Steven C. Tracy, 1954
 The First Book of Rhythms, 1954
 The First Book of the West Indies, 1956
 First Book of Africa, 1964
 Black Misery, illustrated by Arouni, 1969; reprinted 1994, Oxford University Press.

As editor
 The Poetry of the Negro, 1746–1949: an anthology, edited with Arna Bontemps, Garden City, NY: Doubleday, 1949.

Other writings 
 The Langston Hughes Reader, New York: Braziller, 1958.
 Good Morning Revolution: Uncollected Social Protest Writings by Langston Hughes, Lawrence Hill, 1973.
 The Collected Works of Langston Hughes, Missouri: University of Missouri Press, 2001.
 The Selected Letters of Langston Hughes, edited by Arnold Rampersad and David Roessel. Knopf, 2014.
 "My Adventures as a Social Poet" (essay), Phylon, 3rd Quarter 1947.
 "The Negro Artist and The Racial Mountain" (article), The Nation, June 23, 1926.

See also 

 African-American literature
 Langston Hughes Society
 Pan-Africanism

Notes

References 

 Aldrich, Robert (2001). Who's Who in Gay & Lesbian History, Routledge. 
 Bernard, Emily (2001). Remember Me to Harlem: The Letters of Langston Hughes and Carl Van Vechten, 1925–1964, Knopf. 
 Berry, Faith (1983.1992,). "Langston Hughes: Before and Beyond Harlem". In On the Cross of the South, Citadel Press, p. 150; & Zero Hour, pp. 185–186. 
 Chenrow, Fred; Chenrow, Carol (1973). Reading Exercises in Black History, Volume 1, Elizabethtown, PA: The Continental Press, Inc. p. 36. .
 Hughes, Langston (2001). "Fight for Freedom and Other Writings on Civil Rights" (Collected Works of Langston Hughes, Vol. 10). In Christopher C. DeSantis (ed.). Introduction, p. 9. University of Missouri Press. 
 Hutson, Jean Blackwell; & Jill Nelson (February 1992). "Remembering Langston", Essence, p. 96.
 Joyce, Joyce A. (2004). "A Historical Guide to Langston Hughes". In Steven C. Tracy (ed.), Hughes and Twentieth-Century Genderracial Issues, Oxford University Press, p. 136. 
 Nero, Charles I. (1997). "Re/Membering Langston: Homphobic Textuality and Arnold Rampersad's Life of Langston Hughes". In Martin Duberman (ed.), Queer Representations: Reading Lives, Reading Cultures, New York University Press, p. 192. 
 Nero, Charles I. (1999). "Free Speech or Hate Speech: Pornography and its Means of Production". In Larry P. Gross & James D. Woods (eds), Columbia Reader on Lesbians and Gay Men in Media, Society, and Politics, Columbia University Press, p. 500. 
 Nichols, Charles H. (1980). Arna Bontempts-Langston Hughes Letters, 1925–1967, Dodd, Mead & Company. 
 Ostrom, Hans (1993). Langston Hughes: A Study of the Short Fiction, New York: Twayne. 
 Ostrom, Hans (2002). A Langston Hughes Encyclopedia, Westport: Greenwood Press. 
 Rampersad, Arnold (1986). The Life of Langston Hughes, Volume 1: I, Too, Sing America, Oxford University Press. 
 Rampersad, Arnold (1988). The Life of Langston Hughes, Volume 2: I Dream A World.  Oxford University Press. 
 Schwarz, Christa A. B. (2003). "Langston Hughes: A true 'people's poet'". In Gay Voices of the Harlem Renaissance, Indiana University Press, pp. 68–88. 
 West, Sandra L. (2003). "Langston Hughes". In Aberjhani & Sandra West (eds), Encyclopedia of the Harlem Renaissance, Checkmark Press, p. 162.

External links 

 Langston Hughes on Poets.org With poems, related essays, and links.
 Profile and poems of Langston Hughes, including audio files and scholarly essays, at the Poetry Foundation.
 Cary Nelson, "Langston Hughes (1902–1967)". Profile at Modern American Poetry.
 Beinecke Library, Yale. "Langston Hughes at 100".
 Profile at Library of Congress.

Archives
 Langston Hughes Papers. James Weldon Johnson Collection in the Yale Collection of American Literature, Beinecke Rare Book and Manuscript Library.
 Langston Hughes Papers at the Wisconsin Center for Film and Theater Research
 Resources at Library of Congress including audio.
 Representative Poetry Online, University of Toronto
 
 
 
 
 Langston Hughes collection from the Billops-Hatch Archives, 1926–2002
 Langston Hughes collection from the Raymond Danowski Poetry Library, 1932–1969
 Thyra Edwards' collection of Langston Hughes material, 1935–1941

1901 births
1967 deaths
20th-century American dramatists and playwrights
20th-century American male writers
20th-century American non-fiction writers
20th-century American novelists
20th-century American poets
20th-century American short story writers
20th-century translators
Activists from New York (state)
African-American activists
African-American dramatists and playwrights
African-American novelists
African-American poets
African-American short story writers
American columnists
American expatriates in France
American expatriates in the Soviet Union
American male dramatists and playwrights
American male non-fiction writers
American male novelists
American male poets
Broadway composers and lyricists
Columbia School of Engineering and Applied Science alumni
Deaths from cancer in New York (state)
Deaths from prostate cancer
Esquire (magazine) people
Harlem Renaissance
Jazz poetry
Langston family
Lincoln University (Pennsylvania) alumni
Members of the American Academy of Arts and Letters
Novelists from New York (state)
People from Joplin, Missouri
People from Staten Island
People from Westfield, New Jersey
Spingarn Medal winners
Translators of Gabriela Mistral
Writers from Missouri
Writers from New York City